Country News Club, Inc., Lakes Region News Club, Inc., and Portland News Club, LLC, and are private companies that publish community newspapers in Maine and New Hampshire, United States.

Properties 
The companies publish four Daily Sun free daily newspapers: 
 The Conway Daily Sun (Country News Club), founded in 1989, in Conway, New Hampshire.
 The Berlin Daily Sun (Country News Club), founded in 1992, in Berlin, New Hampshire.
 The Laconia Daily Sun (Lakes Region News Club), founded in 2000, in Laconia, New Hampshire.
 The Portland Daily Sun (Portland News Club), founded in 2009, in Portland, Maine.

Country News Club also publishes a weekly newspaper in western Maine, The Northern Light, in addition to Valley Fun, a tourist publication.

Each of the company's newspapers has a local newsroom in the community it covers, though all Country News Club publications, as well as The Portland Daily Sun, are printed in the company's Conway press plant.

The Laconia Daily Sun is printed at the Portsmouth, New Hampshire presses of Seacoast Media Group, which also publishes The Portsmouth Herald.

Personnel 
Country News Club and its daily newspapers were founded by Dave Danforth, Mark Guerringue and Adam Hirshan, the latter two of whom were still on the Conway and Berlin papers' mastheads, as of early 2012, as publisher and editor, respectively.

Guerringue and Hirshan partnered with Edward J. Engler to found Lakes Region News Club and The Laconia Daily Sun. In 2012 Engler remained publisher-editor of the Laconia paper.

The Portland paper was begun in February 2009 as a joint effort of Guerringue, Hirsham and Curtis Robinson, a veteran of free daily newspapers in Aspen and Vail, Colorado, who served as The Portland Daily Suns first editor. As of 2012, Robinson had left the paper and Guerringue was serving as publisher.

References 

Carroll County, New Hampshire
Newspaper companies of the United States
Publishing companies established in 1989